The Detective Goes the Wrong Way (Spanish:Detective a contramano) is a 1949 Uruguayan comedy film directed by Adolfo L. Fabregat and starring Juan Carlos Mareco, Mirtha Torres and Roberto Fontana.

Cast
 Juan Carlos Mareco as Pinocho 
 Mirtha Torres   
 Roberto Fontana 
 Hugo Duharte
 Marta Gularte   
 Dido Pastorino  
 Pebete Romero

References

Bibliography 
 Rist, Peter H. Historical Dictionary of South American Cinema. Rowman & Littlefield, 2014.

External links 
 

1949 films
1949 comedy films
Uruguayan comedy films
1940s Spanish-language films
Uruguayan black-and-white films